Rajanpally is a village in Gudur mandal in Mahabubabad district, India. It comes under the Mahabubabad Lok Sabha and assembly constituency.

Villages in Mahabubabad district